Sotiria Neofytou (Σωτηρία Νεοφύτου, born 23 April 1998) is a Cypriot swimmer. She competed in the women's 100 metre butterfly event at the 2016 Summer Olympics.

References

External links
 

1998 births
Living people
Cypriot female swimmers
Olympic swimmers of Cyprus
Swimmers at the 2016 Summer Olympics
Place of birth missing (living people)
Female butterfly swimmers